The olive marsh snake (Natriciteres olivacea) is a species of snake in the subfamily Natricinae of the family Colubridae. The species is endemic to Sub-Saharan Africa.

Description
N. olivacea is a small snake which exhibits sexual dimorphism.

It has smooth dorsal scales, which are arranged in 19 rows at midbody, reducing to 17 rows towards the rear. 

Dorsally, it is dark olive. Ventrally, it is whitish. The upper labials are whitish, with dark vertical bars at the sutures.

Distribution and habitat
N. olivacea is found in Angola, Benin, Botswana, Cameroon, Central African Republic, both Congos (Democratic Republic of the Congo and Republic of the Congo), Equatorial Guinea, Ethiopia, Gabon, Ghana, Guinea, Ivory Coast, Mali, Mozambique, Namibia, Nigeria, Senegal, Somalia, South Africa, Sudan, Tanzania, Togo, Uganda, Zambia, and Zimbabwe.

The preferred habitat of N. olivacea is savanna.

Biology
N. olivacea is oviparous. In early summer the adult female lays a clutch of 6-8 eggs. Each egg measures 22 x 9 mm (.87 x .35 inch). It preys on winged termites.

References

Further reading
Boulenger GA (1893). Catalogue of the Snakes in the British Museum (Natural History). Volume I., Containing the Families ... Colubridæ Aglyphæ, part. London: Trustees of the British Museum (Natural History). (Taylor and Francis, printers). xiii + 448 pp. + Plates I-XXVIII. (Tropidonotus olivaceus, pp. 227–228).
Loveridge A (1953). "Zoological Results of a Fifth Expedition to East Africa. III. Reptiles from Nyasaland and Tete". Bulletin of the Museum of Comparative Zoology of Harvard College, in Cambridge 110 (3): 141-322 + Plates 1–5. (Natriciteres olivacea, new combination, pp. 251–252).
Peters W (1854). "Diagnosen neuer Batrachier, welcher zusammen mit der früher (24. Juli und 17. August) gegebenen Übersicht der Schlangen und Eidechsen mitgetheilt werden ". Berichte über die zur Bekanntmachung geeigneten Verhandlungen der Königl. Preuss. Akademie der Wissenschaften zu Berlin 1854: 614–628. (Coronella olivacea, new species, pp. 622–623). (in German and Latin).

Reptiles described in 1854
Taxa named by Wilhelm Peters
Reptiles of Africa
Natriciteres
Reptiles of Angola
Reptiles of Ethiopia